Peter Mills is an American musical theatre composer and lyricist. He won the third Fred Ebb award in 2007.

Career
After graduating from Princeton University with a degree in english/dramatic literature, he then acquired his MFA in musical theatre writing at the New York University's Tisch School of the Arts. He is one of the founding members of Prospect Theater Company, which frequently produces his work.

Productions
---(music, lyrics, & book by Mills unless otherwise noted)---

Marco Polo, 2000, lyrics & book (music by Deborah Abramson)
The Flood, 2001, music, lyrics, & book by Mills & Cara Reichel
Illyria, 2002
The Alchemists, 2003, book by Mills & Reichel
Lonely Rhymes, 2004
The Pursuit of Persephone, 2005, book by Mills & Reichel (reopened as The Underclassman in 2014)
Iron Curtain 2006, lyrics (music by Stephen Weiner, book by Susan DiLallo)
The Rockae, 2007, rock musical based on The Bacchae, book by Mills & Reichel
Honor, 2008, based on As You Like It, music, lyrics, & book by Mills & Cara Reichel
Golden Boy of the Blue Ridge, 2009, book by Mills & Reichel
Evergreen, 2009, book by Mills & Reichel
Death For Five Voices, 2013, book by Mills & Reichel
The Honeymooners, 2017, based on the television show, lyrics (music by Stephen Weiner, book by Dusty Kay and Bill Nuss)
The Hello Girls, 2018, book by Mills & Reichel

Personal life
Mills is married to Cara Reichel, whom he met while at Princeton. They started the Prospect Theater Company soon after, and she is his frequent collaborator.

Awards & nominations
 2002 -- Jonathan Larson Performing Arts Foundation grant
 2003 -- ASCAP Foundation Richard Rodgers New Horizons Award
 2006 -- Drama Desk Award nomination -- The Pursuit of Persephone (Music & orchestrations)
 2007—Fred Ebb Award
 2010—Kleban Prize for Musical Theatre lyrics
 2014—Donna Perret Rosen Award

References

American musical theatre composers
Living people
Princeton University alumni
Tisch School of the Arts alumni
Year of birth missing (living people)